Jacob Christian Horst (born 15 July 1997) is an American weightlifter, competing in the 73 kg category. He won a bronze medal at the 2021 Pan American Weightlifting Championships.

Major results

References

External links
 

Living people
1997 births
American male weightlifters
Pan American Weightlifting Championships medalists
21st-century American people